The Zhikong Hydro Power Station, is a reservoir and power station on the Lhasa River in Maizhokunggar County to the east of Lhasa, Tibet, China.
It came into operation in 2007, and has a capacity of 100 MW.

Description

The Zhikong Hydro Power Station lies between the middle and lower reaches of the Lhasa River, also called the Kyi River.
It impounds  of water.
The plant has four 25 MW Francis turbines supplied by Kunming, and is operated by the China Huaneng Group.
Installed capacity is 100 MW and annual production is about 407 GWh.
The reservoir is also used for flood control and irrigation.

Construction

The Lhasa River Zhi Kong hydroelectric power station was a key project of the tenth five-year plan.
Construction began in May 2003, with the No 8 Hydroelectricity Corp of the Armed Police Force responsible for engineering, procurement, and construction.
Construction cost 1.37 billion yuan.
The first generator was commissioned in 2006 and the power station was put into full operation on 23 September 2007.

References

Sources

Reservoirs and dams in Tibet
Maizhokunggar County
Dams in the Brahmaputra River Basin
Dams in China
Hydroelectric power stations in Tibet
Rock-filled dams
Dams completed in 2007
2007 establishments in China
Energy infrastructure completed in 2007
Buildings and structures in Lhasa